This is a non-exhaustive list of mountains of the Appalachians.

References

See also 
List of mountains in Maryland
List of mountains in Massachusetts
List of mountains of New Hampshire
List of mountains in North Carolina
List of mountains of Vermont
List of mountains in Virginia

Appalachians
Appalachians